Politics of Hungary takes place in a framework of a parliamentary representative democratic republic. The prime minister is the head of government of a pluriform multi-party system, while the president is the head of state and holds a largely ceremonial position.

Executive power is exercised by the government. Legislative power is vested in both the government and the parliament. The party system since the last elections is dominated by the conservative Fidesz. The three larger oppositions are Democratic Coalition (DK), Momentum and Jobbik; there are also opposition parties with a small fraction in parliament (e.g. Politics Can Be Different). The judiciary is theoretically independent of the executive and the legislature, but in practice is strongly influenced by the ruling Fidesz Party.

Hungary is an independent state, which has been a member of the European Union since 2004. Since 1989 Hungary has been a parliamentary republic. Legislative power is exercised by the unicameral National Assembly that consists of 199 members. Members of the National Assembly are elected for four years.

The Economist Intelligence Unit rated Hungary a "flawed democracy" in 2020. With a democracy score of 3.96/7, Freedom House no longer considers Hungary a democracy.

In the April 2022 election, Prime Minister Viktor Orbán won a fourth consecutive term in office. His party, Fidesz, secured another two-thirds majority in parliament.

Executive branch

|President
|Katalin Novák
|Fidesz
|10 May 2022
|-
|Prime Minister
|Viktor Orbán
|Fidesz
|29 May 2010
|}
The president of the republic, elected by the National Assembly every five years, has a largely ceremonial role, but he is nominally the commander-in-chief of the armed forces and his powers include the nomination of the prime minister, who is to be elected by a majority of the votes of the members of Parliament, based on the recommendation made by the president of the republic. If the president dies, resigns or is otherwise unable to carry out his duties, the speaker of the National Assembly becomes acting president.

Due to the Hungarian Constitution, based on the post-World War II Basic Law of the Federal Republic of Germany, the prime minister has a leading role in the executive branch as he selects Cabinet ministers and has the exclusive right to dismiss them (similarly to the competences of the German federal chancellor). Each cabinet nominee appears before one or more parliamentary committees in consultative open hearings, survive a vote by the Parliament and must be formally approved by the president.

In Communist Hungary, the executive branch of the Hungarian People's Republic was represented by the Council of Ministers.

Legislative branch

The unicameral, 199-member National Assembly (Országgyűlés) is the highest organ of state authority and initiates and approves legislation sponsored by the prime minister. Its members are elected for a four-year term. The election threshold is 5%, but it only applies to the multi-seat constituencies and the compensation seats, not the single-seat constituencies.

Political parties and elections

There are basically two main factions in the Hungarian political system, the right-wing FIDESZ-KDNP coalition, and the center-right to left-wing United for Hungary which consists of the following parties: DK, MSZP, Jobbik, Dialogue, LMP-Greens, Momentum. There are also associate parties and movements such as ÚVNP, Liberals, New Start, MMM movement, 99M movement. There are also some minor parties which are not part of these two coalitions such as the far-right Our Homeland Movement, and the joke party called Hungarian Two Tailed Dog Party. Most of the Hungarian church also is involved with politics.

Judicial branches

A fifteen-member Constitutional Court has power to challenge legislation on grounds of unconstitutionality. This body was last filled in July 2010. Members are elected for a term of twelve years.

The president of the Supreme Court of Hungary (Curia) and the Hungarian civil and penal legal system he leads is fully independent of the Executive Branch.

The attorney general or chief prosecutor of Hungary is currently fully independent of the executive branch, but his status is actively debated.

Several ombudsman offices exist in Hungary to protect civil, minority, educational and ecological rights in non-judicial matters. They have held the authority to issue legally binding decisions since late 2003.

Financial branch
The central bank, the Hungarian National Bank was fully self-governing between 1990 and 2004, but new legislation gave certain appointment rights to the executive branch in November 2004 which is disputed before the Constitutional Court.

Administrative divisions
Hungary is divided in 19 counties (megyék, singular – megye), 23 urban counties* (megyei jogú városok, singular – megyei jogú város), and 1 capital city** (főváros); Bács-Kiskun, Baranya, Békés, Békéscsaba*, Borsod-Abaúj-Zemplén, Budapest**, Csongrád, Debrecen*, Dunaújváros*, Eger*, Érd*, Fejér, Győr*, Győr-Moson-Sopron, Hajdú-Bihar, Heves, Hódmezővásárhely*, Jász-Nagykun-Szolnok, Kaposvár*, Kecskemét*, Komárom-Esztergom, Miskolc*, Nagykanizsa*, Nógrád, Nyíregyháza*, Pécs*, Pest, Salgótarján*, Somogy, Sopron*, Szabolcs-Szatmár-Bereg, Szeged*, Szekszárd*, Székesfehérvár*, Szolnok*, Szombathely*, Tatabánya*, Tolna, Vas, Veszprém, Veszprém*, Zala, Zalaegerszeg*

Involvement in international organisations
Hungary is a member of the ABEDA, Australia Group, BIS, CE, CEI, CERN, CEPI EAPC, EBRD, ECE, EU (member, as by 1 May 2004), FAO, IAEA, IBRD, ICAO, ICC, ICRM, IDA, IEA, IFC, IFRCS, ILO, IMF, IMO, Inmarsat, Intelsat, Interpol, IOC, IOM, ISO, ITU, ITUC, NAM (guest), NATO, NEA, NSG, OAS (observer), OECD, OPCW, OSCE, PCA, SECI, UN, UNCTAD, UNESCO, UNFICYP, UNHCR, UNIDO, UNIKOM, UNMIBH, UNMIK, UNOMIG, UNU, UPU, WCO, WFTU, Visegrád Group, WHO, WIPO, WMO, WToO, WTrO, and the Zangger Committee.

Ministries
Note: with restructuring and reorganisation, this information may change even within a governmental period.

Ministers without portfolio

 Ministers without portfolio: János Süli, Andrea Bártfai-Mager, Katalin Novák

Notes

References